Katariina Johanna "Kati" Kovalainen (born 24 January 1975) is a Finnish retired ice hockey player and former member of the Finnish national ice hockey team. She represented Finland in the women's ice hockey tournament at the 2006 Winter Olympics in Torino, at nine IIHF Women's World Championships, and at two IIHF European Women Championships.

Her club career spanned nineteen seasons and was played in the Finnish Naisten SM-sarja with the Imatran Ketterä, Kalevan Pallo Naiset, the Keravan Shakers, the Espoo Blues Naiset, and HPK Kiekkonaiset; and in the Russian Women's Hockey League with SKIF Nizhny Novgorod.

References

External links
 
 

1975 births
Living people
Finnish women's ice hockey forwards
Espoo Blues Naiset players
HPK Kiekkonaiset players
Ice hockey players at the 2006 Winter Olympics
IHK Naiset players
KalPa Naiset players
Keravan Shakers players
Naisten Liiga All-Stars
Olympic ice hockey players of Finland
People from Leppävirta
HC SKIF players
Sportspeople from North Savo